Temperate grasslands, savannas, and shrublands is a terrestrial biome defined by the World Wide Fund for Nature. The predominant vegetation in this biome consists of grass and/or shrubs. The climate is temperate and ranges from semi-arid to semi-humid. The habitat type differs from tropical grasslands in the annual temperature regime as well as the types of species found here.

The habitat type is known as prairie in North America, pampas in South America, veld in Southern Africa and steppe in Asia. Generally speaking, these regions are devoid of trees, except for riparian or gallery forests associated with streams and rivers.

Steppes/shortgrass prairies are short grasslands that occur in semi-arid climates. Tallgrass prairies are tall grasslands in areas of higher rainfall. Heaths and pastures are, respectively, low shrublands and grasslands where forest growth is hindered by human activity but not the climate.

Tall grasslands, including the tallgrass prairie of North America, the north-western parts of Eurasian steppe (Ukraine and south of Russia) and the Humid Pampas of Argentina, have moderate rainfall and rich soils which make them ideally suited to agriculture, and tall grassland ecoregions include some of the most productive grain-growing regions in the world. The expanses of grass in North America and Eurasia once sustained migrations of large vertebrates such as bison (Bos bison), saiga (Saiga tatarica), and Tibetan antelopes (Pantholops hodgsoni) and kiang (Equus hemionus). Such phenomena now occur only in isolated pockets, primarily in the Daurian Steppe and Tibetan Plateau.

Temperate savannahs, found in Southern South America, parts of West Asia, South Africa and southern Australia, are a mixed grassy woodland ecosystem defined by trees being reasonably widely spaced so that the canopy does not close, much like subtropical and tropical savannahs, albeit lacking a year-round warm climate. In many savannas, tree densities are higher and are more regularly spaced than in forests.

The floral communities of the Eurasian steppes and the North American Great Plains have been largely extirpated through conversion to agriculture. Nonetheless, as many as 300 different plant species may grow on less than three acres of North American tallgrass prairie, which also may support more than 3 million individual insects per acre. The Patagonian Steppe and Grasslands are notable for distinctiveness at the generic and familial level in a variety of taxa.

Temperate grasslands, savannas, and shrublands ecoregions

See also

Tussock grass
Great Plains

References

External links
Temperate Grassland

 
Terrestrial biomes